Rancho San Antonio was a  Mexican land grant in present-day Santa Clara County, California given in 1839 by Governor Juan Alvarado to Juan Prado Mesa.  The grant was bounded by Adobe Creek to the north and Stevens Creek to the south, and included Permanente Creek, and present-day Los Altos Hills.

History
Juan Prado Mesa (1806–1845) was born in Santa Clara, grandson of Corporal José Valerio Mesa who came to California with the Anza Expedition, and son of Jose Antonio Mesa, grantee of Rancho Los Medanos.  Since 1828, Juan Prado Mesa had been a soldier at the San Francisco Presidio.  In 1835, when Vallejo moved his company to Sonoma, Alférez Juan Prado Mesa was left in charge of the San Francisco Presidio.  Later Mesa served as the commander of the Santa Clara Mission guard.  Juan Prado Mesa was wounded in an Indian fight in 1838, granted Rancho San Antonio in 1839, and died from his wounds in 1845.

With the cession of California to the United States following the Mexican-American War, the 1848 Treaty of Guadalupe Hidalgo provided that the land grants would be honored. As required by the Land Act of 1851, claims for Rancho San Antonio were filed with the Public Land Commission. Six claims were filed - two of which were patented. A claim for  filed by Henry C. Curtis  with the Land Commission in 1853 was rejected. A claim for  filed by William A. Dana and Henry F. Dana  with the Land Commission in 1853 was rejected. A claim for  filed by James W. Weeks  with the Land Commission in 1853 was rejected. A claim for  filed by William W. White  with the Land Commission in 1853 was rejected.

Much of the land grant is now the Rancho San Antonio County Park.

See also

References

San Antonio de Padua
Antonio de Padua
Los Altos, California
San Antonio de Padua